Ditte Gråbøl (born 22 June 1959 in Copenhagen) is a Danish actress. She trained at Aarhus Teater and graduated in 1984. Having worked at Jomfru Ane Teatret, she has appeared in a number of revues, among others the Cirkusrevyen more than once. She has also appeared on TV in Flemming og Berit, Fæhår og Harzen, Bryggeren, Krøniken, The Eagle and Album. Her breakthrough came with the DR satire show, Den gode, den onde og den virk'li sjove which was broadcast from 1990 to 1992. She played various parts on the show but is particularly remembered for her portrayal of a cantankerous, coughing woman in the "Four ordinary Danes" sketch. Gråbøl's name was at the time Ditte Knudsen, Knudsen being her maiden name. She began using the surname of Gråbøl after marrying the director, Niels Gråbøl in 1992. They were, however, divorced in 1998.

Filmography 
 Møv og Funder – 1991
 Det store flip – 1997
 Baby Doom – 1998
 Dybt vand – 1999
 Dykkerne – 2000
 En kort en lang – 2001
 Move Me – 2003
 Oh Happy Day – 2004
 Anklaget – 2005
 Lotto – 2006
 Ledsaget udgang – 2007
 In a Better World – 2010
 A Caretaker's Tale – 2012

Television series
 Lykke – 2011

Awards 
 1994: Tagea Brandt Rejselegat

External links 

1959 births
Living people
Danish stage actresses
Danish television actresses
Best Supporting Actress Bodil Award winners
Actresses from Copenhagen